Albin Siwak (January 27, 1933 – April 4, 2019) was a Polish politician, author of memoirs and a social activist. Later in his career, Siwak held nationalist and anti-semitic views.

Biography 
Son of Józef and Czesława née Mielczarek. He was born in Wołomin. In 1935 he and his family moved to Praga. His father was a member of the Polish Socialist Party, his mother worked as a housewife. He spent World War II and occupation of Poland with his family in Warsaw. After the war, he and his father left for the Recovered Territories, where in the village of Lutry. He completed seven classes of elementary school.

In 1950 he went to Warsaw in search of work. He was directed to the masonry brigade. He quickly became a shock worker. From the 1950s he was an active activist in trade unions. From 1968 he belonged to the Polish United Workers' Party. He was delegate for the VIII, IX and X Congress of the Polish United Workers' Party. In 1979, the Congress of Trade Unions elected him a member of the World Federation of Trade Unions.

From July 1981 was a member of the Central Committee of the Polish United Workers' Party. From 1981 to 1986 was a member of the Politburo of the Polish United Workers' Party. In the 1980s, he was an opponent and critic of Solidarity movement. From 1986 he was a councilor of the Polish Embassy in Tripoli. Dismissed from his diplomatic position in March 1990 by Foreign Minister Krzysztof Skubiszewski.

After 1990, he was a member of the Social Democracy of the Republic of Poland. He was removed from the party after the conflict with Leszek Miller.

References

1933 births
2019 deaths
People from Wołomin
Members of the Politburo of the Polish United Workers' Party
Democratic Left Alliance politicians
Diplomats of the Polish People's Republic
Polish Roman Catholics
Polish United Workers' Party members